Lotanga is a genus of moths of the family Crambidae. It contains only one species, Lotanga milvinalis, which is found in Sri Lanka.

References

Pyraustinae
Crambidae genera
Taxa named by Frederic Moore